RandstadRail is a light rail network in the Rotterdam–The Hague metropolitan area in the west of the Netherlands that is jointly operated by HTM Personenvervoer (HTM) and Rotterdamse Elektrische Tram (RET). It connects the cities of Rotterdam, The Hague and Zoetermeer, primarily using former train and existing tram tracks.

Named after the Randstad conurbation, the light rail network came into operation in 2006, after regular train services on the Hofpleinlijn and Zoetermeer Stadslijn had been discontinued. In 2018, it had a daily ridership of around 125,000 passengers.

Light rail network 

The RandstadRail network consists of four routes: one metro line (E) between The Hague and Rotterdam, and three tram-train lines (3, 4 and 34) between The Hague and Zoetermeer. Line E is operated by RET and uses high-floor Flexity Swift vehicles, while lines 3, 4 and 34 are operated by HTM and use low-floor RegioCitadis vehicles. Stations that are served by both types of carriages have extended platforms with a higher and a lower part.

Line E 

Line E (formerly ) is a metro line, which also belongs to the Rotterdam Metro network. For a great part, it runs on the former Hofpleinlijn railway line between Den Haag Centraal railway station and Rotterdam Hofplein railway station. After the train services had been discontinued, the track was re-opened as a RandstadRail line in September 2006, running between Nootdorp and Hofplein. In November 2006, the line was extended to The Hague.

As part of the line's conversion to RandstadRail operation, it began using RET metro trains, and more stops were added and train frequencies increased. Although the conversion had not been flawless, with a series of technical problems and a derailment, the line has been in full operation since September 2007.

In December 2011, the line was further extended to Slinge metro station in the south of Rotterdam, sharing the section between Rotterdam Centraal and Slinge with the already existing line D.

Lines 3, 4 and 34 
The RandstadRail network originally included two tram-train lines: line 3 between Loosduinen and Zoetermeer Centrum-West, and line 4 between De Uithof and Lansingerland-Zoetermeer. On 23 July 2020, a third tram-train line was added to the network: line 34, which serves as a combination of lines 3 and 4, connecting Loosduinen to Lansingerland-Zoetermeer railway station.

Between Den Haag Centraal and Zoetermeer, they operate on dedicated tracks as a light rail system. The section from Den Haag Centraal to Laan van NOI is elevated on a viaduct. From Laan van NOI to Leidschenveen, the lines share the track and stations with line E.

East of Leidschenveen, line 3 follows the same route as the former Zoetermeer Stadslijn, while lines 4 and 34 branch off towards Oosterheem after Seghwaert station. In 2019, the Oosterheem branch was extended from Javalaan to Lansingerland-Zoetermeer.

Other services

ZoRo buses 
In December 2012, two bus lines were added to the network. These so-called "ZoRo" buses run between Zoetermeer and Rodenrijs RandstadRail station, where they connect with RandstadRail line E. A new bus lane was constructed for the project. The buses are operated by RET and have an almost instant connection to arriving metros at Rodenrijs station. At the termini in Zoetermeer, the ZoRo buses connect with regional bus lines (Arriva and Veolia Transport) and RandstadRail lines 3, 4 and 34.

Associated tram lines 
Despite not being a part of the RandstadRail network, lines 2 and 19 of HTM's local tram network make use of RandstadRail-liveried RegioCitadis vehicles in addition to the regular Siemens Avenio trams. For line 19, this is necessary as it lacks balloon loops at its termini, meaning that the uni-directional GTL8 vehicles cannot be used on this route. Since 2015, the rolling stock of line 2 has been gradually replaced by Avenio vehicles.

Gallery

See also 
 Trams in The Hague
 Trams in Rotterdam

References

External links 

 Official website (archived)
 Route map and connections

Light rail in the Netherlands
Railway lines in the Netherlands